Kurian-e Gowra (also Romanized as Kūrīān-e Gowrā; also known as Gūrān-e Gowrā, Gūrīān-e Gorā, Gūrīān-e Gowrā, Gūrīān-e Gowreh, Gūrīān Gora, Gūrīyan-e Gūrā and Kūreyān Gowreh) is a village in Hasanabad Rural District, in the Central District of Ravansar County, Kermanshah Province, Iran. At the 2006 census, its population was 90, in 21 families.

References 

Populated places in Ravansar County